Hadieh Shafie (born 1969) is an Iranian-American visual artist based in Brooklyn, New York.

Biography 
She was born in Tehran, Iran, and migrated to the United States in 1983. She has a BA in Painting from University of Maryland, College Park (1993), an MFA in painting from the Pratt Institute (1999) and an MFA in Imaging and Digital Art from the University of Maryland, Baltimore County (2004).

Many of her works comprise tightly coiled strips of brightly coloured paper, bearing calligraphy, arranged in patterns: she has described them as "part sculpture, part drawing, part artist’s book".

Her works are held, among others, by the British Museum, Metropolitan Museum of Art, Victoria and Albert Museum, Los Angeles County Museum of Art (LACMA) Sheldon Museum of Art and the United States State Department.

Shafie held a solo exhibition, "Surfaced", in New York's Leila Heller Gallery in March and April 2015.

References

External links
Hadieh Shafie's official website

1969 births
Living people
20th-century American women artists
21st-century American women artists
20th-century Iranian women artists
21st-century Iranian women artists
American people of Iranian descent
People from Tehran
Pratt Institute alumni
University of Maryland, Baltimore County alumni
University of Maryland, College Park alumni
American artists of Iranian descent